The Magyar Kupa Final was the final match of the 2011–12 Magyar Kupa, played between MTK Budapest and Debrecen.

Route to the final

Match

References

External links
 Official site 

2012
Debreceni VSC matches
MTK Budapest FC matches
Association football penalty shoot-outs